My Everything is the second studio album by American singer Ariana Grande, released on August 22, 2014, by Republic Records. In the album's production, Grande worked with a host of producers and co-writers, including Max Martin, Shellback, Benny Blanco, Ryan Tedder, Darkchild, Ilya Salmanzadeh, Zedd, and David Guetta, to name a few.

Grande sought for My Everything to sound as "an evolution" from her debut album Yours Truly (2013); exploring more mature and diverse lyrical content and musical styles. Primarily a pop and R&B record, My Everything expands on the 1990s retro-R&B style of its predecessor, while also approaching new genres such as EDM, electropop and dance-pop. Iggy Azalea, Zedd, Big Sean, Cashmere Cat, Childish Gambino, The Weeknd and A$AP Ferg make guest appearances on My Everything, as well as Jessie J and Nicki Minaj on the deluxe edition.

My Everything debuted atop the Billboard 200 albums chart in the United States, selling 169,000 copies in its first week, marking Grande's second consecutive chart-topper in the US. It was later certified double platinum by the Recording Industry Association of America, and was listed as one of the most popular albums of 2014, 2015 and the 2010s on the Billboard 200. The album debuted at number one in Australia and Canada as well, and peaked in the top ten of twenty countries worldwide. It received generally favorable reviews from music critics, appearing in year-end best-music lists of 2014. At the 57th Annual Grammy Awards in 2015, My Everything was nominated for Best Pop Vocal Album.

My Everything was supported by five singles; all of which reached global success. The lead single, "Problem", broke numerous digital sales records upon release, and peaked at number two on the US Billboard Hot 100. The second single, "Break Free", reached number four in the United States. The following single, "Bang Bang", peaked at number three in the US and topped charts internationally. The fourth and fifth singles, "Love Me Harder" and "One Last Time", peaked at numbers seven and thirteen, respectively, with the latter reaching number two in the United Kingdom. Aided by My Everything's singles, Grande attained the most top ten hits for any artist in 2014 on the Hot 100. To further support the album, Grande embarked on the Honeymoon Tour in 2015.

Background and recording 

The singer's debut studio album Yours Truly was released on September 3, 2013, and was met with critical acclaim. Later that month, in an interview with Rolling Stone, Grande stated that she had begun writing and working on her second studio album and had already completed two songs. Recording sessions began in October 2013 with Grande working with previous producers from her debut album Harmony Samuels and Tommy Brown. Grande was initially aiming at releasing the album around February 2014. In January 2014, Grande confirmed she had been working with new producers Ryan Tedder, Savan Kotecha, Benny Blanco, Key Wane and Max Martin. Grande stated in late February that she wanted to name her album after a song she had finished that weekend that is very honest and makes her cry.

It was announced on March 3, 2014, that Grande would be featured on the fifth single from Chris Brown's album X titled "Don't Be Gone Too Long". The single was originally set for release on March 25, 2014. However, it was postponed due to Brown being sent to jail awaiting trial on assault charges. Grande had announced the song's delay on March 17, 2014, via Twitter stating "My loves… so obviously some things have changed recently... So we have to delay the dbgtl countdown, some things are out of our control". That same night she held a live stream to make up for the single's delay, where she previewed four new songs from her second album. Two days following the announcement, Grande revealed that due to the song's delay, she would be releasing the first single from her upcoming second studio album instead. She finished working on the album in late May 2014. On June 28, Grande confirmed the title of the album to be My Everything and the release date to be August 25, 2014. The photos for the packaging in the album were taken on May 27, 2014. Grande stated that she chose the cover artwork because she felt that "each song is so strongly themed that I just wanted to have a very simple overall cover. So that within each song we could create more visual themes."

Music and lyrics 
My Everything is a pop-R&B album. It revisits the '90's retro-R&B style present in Grande's debut album Yours Truly: Annie Zaleski from The A.V. Club, described the album as a "slick throwback to melodramatic '80s and '90s pop." The album's tracks include EDM, hip hop tunes and piano-driven ballads. The album opens with "Intro", in which Grande addresses her fans: "I'll give you all I have and nothing less, I promise". The second track is the lead single "Problem", an uptempo dance-pop song influenced by R&B, jazz, hip hop and funk. Rap-Up described the track as an "infectious horn-heavy jam" that features a "carefree" Grande "declaring her independence". It includes "an empowering verse from Iggy Azalea and a whispering Big Sean on the hook." "One Last Time" is a dance-pop and EDM-light song. The album continues with "Why Try", co-written and co-produced by Ryan Tedder and Benny Blanco and features the lyrics "Now we're screaming just to see who's louder". Some critics expressed an opinion that the song has a similar composition with Beyoncé's "XO" (2013; also produced by Tedder).

The following track is the EDM song "Break Free". The song combines the EDM and electro genres. In an interview with Billboard, Grande described the song as "fantastic and super-experimental for [her]" and stated: "I never thought I'd do an EDM song, but that was an eye-opening experience, and now all I want to do is dance." The album's first of three ballads, "Best Mistake", features Big Sean. Billboard described it as "A moody ballad that grows stickier upon each listen, "Best Mistake" carries a tidy collection of impressive production details, the momentary string stabs among them". Musically, it is a minimal hip-hop piano ballad lament that utilizes instrumentation from strings and a drum machine. It tells a story about a couple trying to "make up their minds about the future of their relationship, with deep affection buried underneath their problems." "Be My Baby" featuring Cashmere Cat is a "bouncy R&B jam". The song was compared with Mariah Carey's songs. The eighth track, "Break Your Heart Right Back", featuring Childish Gambino, is about her boyfriend cheating on her with a man and contains the lyrics "I know you're mad 'cause I found out / Want you to feel what I feel right now". The song interpolates Diana Ross's "I'm Coming Out."

"Love Me Harder", featuring The Weeknd, is a mid-tempo synthpop and R&B song, which starts small before its "'throbbing', electro-heavy chorus", with a guitar riff, while "big vacuum-esque synths zip" can be heard throughout the track. Rob Copsey wrote for The Official Charts Company that the song reminded him of Drake at his most emotional. Lyrically, the song has Grande demanding romantic satisfaction, using double entendres about BDSM. The track "Just a Little Bit of Your Heart" is the album's second ballad, co-written by Harry Styles. Official Charts compared the eleventh track, "Hands on Me", featuring ASAP Ferg, with Rihanna's "Cockiness (Love It)" (2012) and Azalea's "Fancy" (2014). Jason Lipshutz of Billboard described "Hands on Me" as "an out-of-left-field banger that removes Grande from her teenybopper phase and finds the 21-year-old discovering her inner Rihanna with lines." The title track "My Everything" concludes the standard edition of the album on a somber note, recalling "Intro", and concerns Grande's struggles to regain the solid footing she once had with her partner.

The first bonus track on deluxe edition, "Bang Bang", featuring Jessie J and Nicki Minaj is an up-tempo, "soulful" song that features a "clap-heavy" production built over "big bouncy beats and horn blasts". The next track was described by Billboard as "short, snappy and sumptuous, 'Only 1' is a light confection that succeeds due to its busy, intricate percussion". The deluxe edition of My Everything concludes with the track "You Don't Know Me".

Release and promotion 

On June 28, 2014, Grande announced that her album would be available for pre-order through her website. Those who pre-ordered the album would get exclusive access to Grande's concert stream that will be held on August 24 where she will perform songs from her album live for the first time. Grande embarked on her first world tour titled The Honeymoon Tour in support of the album which began in February 2015.

In the weeks preceding the release of My Everything, several previews of songs from the album were released. On July 7, 2014, Grande posted a teaser of "Best Mistake" onto her Instagram page. The song features rapper Big Sean. On July 27, 2014, a preview of "Be My Baby" was filmed at a concert of featured artist, Cashmere Cat, and uploaded to YouTube, by a fan. Grande retweeted a link to the video on her Twitter profile. She then retweeted a second snippet on August 4. Twenty days before the album's release, Grande released a preview of "Love Me Harder", which features Canadian recording artist The Weeknd, onto her Instagram profile. On August 20, four songs from the album, "Why Try", "Be My Baby", "Love Me Harder", and "Just a Little Bit of Your Heart", were released courtesy of MTV.

On August 24, Grande opened the 2014 MTV Video Music Awards with "Break Free" and then later appeared to perform "Bang Bang" with Jessie J and Nicki Minaj. Following her performance on the show, My Everything was released worldwide on August 25, 2014. During the week of its release, commercials aired on television to promote My Everything as well as the Beats Pill. On August 29, Grande performed "Problem", "Break Free", "Bang Bang", and "Break Your Heart Right Back" on The Today Show. In addition to performing, Grande was also interviewed, forecasted to weather and brought her grandmother for an interview of her own. On September 5, Grande performed the title track from My Everything during the Stand Up to Cancer television program in dedication to her grandfather, who had died from cancer earlier that year.

Singles 
Grande premiered her first single "Problem", which features Australian rapper Iggy Azalea, at the 2014 Radio Disney Music Awards and released it for digital download later that night on April 28, 2014. The song debuted at number three on the Billboard Hot 100 and sold 438,000 units in its first week making it the fifth largest debut by a woman in history. The single later peaked at number two on the Hot 100, holding that position for five non-consecutive weeks. The single has sold 3.7 million copies in the US and has been certified sextuple platinum by the Recording Industry Association of America (RIAA) in March 2016.

The second single, "Break Free", features electronic music producer Zedd and was released on July 2, 2014. The song debuted at number 15 on the Billboard Hot 100 with 161,000 downloads sold in its first week. After the release of the song's music video, "Break Free" soared on the Hot 100 from number 18 to number four, while Grande's other singles, "Bang Bang" and "Problem" were also in the top ten that week, at numbers ten and seven respectively. With three songs in the top ten, Ariana Grande became the second female lead artist to have three singles in the top ten since Adele in 2012. It also reached number one on the Billboard Dance/Electronic Digital Songs chart. "Break Free" has sold 1.9 million copies as of June 2020, and is certified triple platinum by the RIAA.

"Bang Bang" by Jessie J, Ariana Grande, and Nicki Minaj, was first sent to hot adult contemporary radios on July 28, 2014, through Republic Records, the label that houses all three artists, being released as a digital download on July 29, 2014, through Lava and Republic, serving as a joint single. It serves as the lead single from Jessie J's album Sweet Talker, and the third single from My Everything. The song debuted at number six, and peaked at number three on the Hot 100, while debuting atop the UK Singles Chart. As of November 2017, "Bang Bang" was certified sextuple platinum by the RIAA, and has sold 3.5 million copies in the US since its release.

The fourth single, "Love Me Harder", which features Canadian PBR&B artist The Weeknd, was released to rhythmic crossover radio on September 30, 2014. It debuted at number 79, and later peaked at number seven on the Hot 100, making Grande the artist with the most top-ten singles in 2014. It also became The Weeknd's first top ten entry in the United States. As of April 2018, the song had sold 1.3 million copies in the United States and has been certified triple platinum by the Recording Industry Association of America (RIAA).

"One Last Time" was released to rhythmic crossover and contemporary hit radio stations on February 10, 2015, as the fifth and final single. It debuted at number 80 on the Hot 100 and peaked at number 13, becoming the only single from the album to not reach the top ten. As of June 2020, "One Last Time" has sold 918,000 digital units in the US, and is certified Platinum by the RIAA.

Promotional singles 
"Best Mistake" featuring Big Sean was released on August 12, 2014, as a promotional single to those who preorder the album. It sold 104,000 units in its first week landing at number six on the Digital Songs chart. It also peaked at number 49 on the Billboard Hot 100.

Critical reception 

On Metacritic, which assigns a weighted average score out of 100 to ratings and reviews from mainstream critics, My Everything received an average of 64, based on 19 reviews, which the cite defines as "generally favorable reviews". Rob Sheffield, writing for Rolling Stone, says, "My Everything proves, she's already a major force" on a release showing how Grande is growing up because "It's a confident, intelligent, brazen pop statement, mixing bubblegum diva vocals with EDM break-beats." Adam Markovitz says for Entertainment Weekly how "Grande has picked a set of songs so lyrically bland, sonically inoffensive, and artistically empty that they produce a zero-impact experience—musical vanilla fro-yo poured directly into your ears." Markovitz states, "It's by no means painful; there are even moments of fun, including the thigh-high-boot swagger of summer smashes 'Problem' and 'Bang Bang,' both of which borrow their strut from coheadliners Iggy Azalea and Jessie J with Nicki Minaj, respectively." Mikael Wood, writing on behalf of the Los Angeles Times, finds Grande in impressive form because she is "deeply cheerful yet with guns blazing, an innocent newcomer no more."

Elysa Gardner, on behalf of USA Today, writes that Grande "digs into ballads and more emotionally earnest fare" simultaneously, doing so with a "girlish playfulness... and a sense of growing confidence", and she is "Blending sugar and spice" together to create a pleasing concoction to satisfy the varying palates of her supporters." Stephen Thomas Erlewine says for AllMusic that "Grande doesn't embody the songs the way an old-fashioned diva would, but she functions as a likeable pop ringleader, stepping aside when the track calls for it and then unleashing a full-throated wail when it's her time to shine." Jason Lipshutz from Billboard writes that the album "turned Grande into a dance artist, pop artist, and soul artist" with a more uniformed and more mature sound. Gary Graff says on behalf of The Oakland Press that it is "a solid step forward for Grande, which makes 'there's more to see' an intriguing promise rather than a threat." In a 7.7 out of ten review for Pitchfork, Meaghan Garvey explains how it "feels like Grande's arrival as a true pop fixture, not just a charming novelty... and while the best songs here may not be timeless, they certainly feel right for right now." The album was placed at number eleven on Digital Spys Best Albums of 2014 list. Jessica Goodman and Ryan Kistobak of The Huffington Post included the album on their list of 2014's best releases, commenting that the album makes sure "Grande's sheer talent did not go unnoticed".

In a more mixed review, Jim Farber from the New York Daily News writes that Grande's "sexed-up" vocals and range are shown off but the "constant jerking back and forth between styles interrupts any sense of flow." Caroline Sullivan from The Guardian praises Grande's vocals but feels that the songs are indistinct and have a "facelessness" to them. Annie Zaleski writes for The A.V. Club how it "is so well-constructed and designed to succeed, it rarely loosens up enough to let any depth of character (or real surprises) surface", yet it "further establishes Grande as a consummate performer and vocal interpreter." Kitty Empire from The Observer notes that Grande's vocal ability is showcased but that the songs lack personality. Evan Sawdey, writing for PopMatters, commented that Grande mimicks other artists, leaving her distinguished voice with only the support of hollow lyricism. In agreement, Will Robinson rated the album a 2.5 out of five for Sputnikmusic, saying it "ends up ringing hollow". Writing for Vibe magazine, Adelle Platon was positive towards the album's sound and compared Grande's vocals to those of Mariah Carey and Christina Aguilera. Andrew Chan, writing on behalf of Slant Magazine, stated that Grande "emphasizes the sheer fun of singing over any sense of emotional urgency", yet "What her voice lacks in depth, texture, and variety will probably take time to acquire."

More than three years after the album's release, Grande's graceful, yet precarious, kneeling pose on a stool for the album's cover suddenly became a viral subject on Twitter, spawning a humorous conspiracy theory, memes, a "challenge" taken up by many to try to recreate the pose, and international press coverage.

Accolades

Commercial performance 
On August 27, Billboard reported that My Everything would sell over 160,000 copies in its first week. My Everything officially debuted at number one on the Billboard 200 and sold 169,000 copies in its first week. By doing so, Grande attained her second consecutive number-one album in the country, becoming the first female artist to have her first two albums debut at number one since Scottish singer Susan Boyle did it with I Dreamed a Dream (2009) and The Gift (2010). The album has sold 759,000 copies in the United States as of April 2018. In March 2016, the RIAA certified the album double platinum, for combined album sales, on-demand audio, video streams, track sales equivalent of two million album-equivalent units. In Japan, My Everything remained atop the iTunes Store chart for nine weeks, thus earning Grande the longest at number one in 2014, breaking the previous record held by Frozen: Original Motion Picture Soundtrack.

In 2015, My Everything was ranked as the 17th most popular album of the year on the Billboard'' 200.

Track listing 

Notes
 denotes a vocal producer
 denotes a co-producer
 denotes a remixer

Sample credits
"Problem" interpolates lyrics from "99 Problems" by Jay-Z.
"Break Your Heart Right Back" contains elements of both "Mo Money Mo Problems" by The Notorious B.I.G. and "I'm Coming Out" by Diana Ross.
"Only 1" samples "Make The Music With Your Mouth, Biz" by Biz Markie feat. T.J. Swan.
"Cadillac Song" contains samples from "How Love Hurts" written by Leon Sylvers.

Personnel 
Adapted from album liner notes.

Vocal credits
Ariana Grande – lead vocals
Big Sean – featured artist, background vocals
Iggy Azalea – featured artist
The Weeknd – featured artist
ASAP Ferg – featured artist
Childish Gambino – featured artist
Victoria McCants – background vocals
Savan Kotecha – background vocals
Ilya – background vocals
Jeanette Olsson – background vocals
Max Martin – background vocals
Sibel – background vocals
Joi Gilliam – background vocals
Taura Stinson – background vocals
Chonita "N'Dambi" Gillespie – background vocals
Rickard Goransson – background vocals

Managerial and creative
Andre Marsh – A&R coordinator
Wendy Goldstein – A&R, executive producer
Naim Alli McNair – A&R
Jessica Severn – album design
Ariana Grande – executive producer
Scott "Scooter" Braun – executive producer, management
Allison Kaye – management
Tom Munro – photographer
Donna Gryn – marketing manager
Brad Haugen – marketing manager
Laura Hess – marketing manager

Technical

Ariana Grande – executive producer, vocal producer
Victoria McCants –  vocal producer
Tommy Brown – producer, programmer, engineer
Serban Ghenea – mixing
John Hanes – mixing engineer
Tom Coyne – mastering
Aya Merrill – mastering
Ilya –  producer, vocal producer, guitar, bass, keys, programmer
Max Martin – producer, vocal producer, keys, programmer
Savan Kotecha – producer, vocal producer
Shellback – producer, keys, programmer
Peter Carlsson – vocal producer, engineer, vocal engineer
Sam Holland – engineer
Leon Silva – saxophone
Rami Yacoub – producer, vocal producer, programmer
Carl Falk –  producer, programmer, guitar
Eric Weaver – engineer
Benjamin Levin – producer, programmer, instrumentation
Ryan Tedder – producer, programmer, instrumentation
Noel Zancanella –  producer, programmer, instrumentation
Chris Sclafani – engineer
Matthew Tryba – engineer
Bradford H. Smith – assistant engineer
Phil Seaford – assistant mixing engineer
Andrew Luftman – production coordinator
Seif Hussain – production coordinator
Anton Zaslavski – producer, mixing, programmer, instrumentation
Ryan Shanahan – engineer
Jesse Taub – engineer
Cory Brice – engineer
Dwane Weir – producer
Sauce – vocal producer
Magnus August Hoiberg – producer, programmer, instrumentation
Peder Losnegard – producer, programmer, instrumentation
Pop Wansel – producer
Oak Felder – producer
Kevin Guardado – assistant producer
Peter Svenssin – producer
Ali Payami – producer, programmer, bass, drums, keyboard, percussion
Jason Quenneville – engineer
Niklas Ljungfelt – guitar
Peter Zimney – saxophone
Johan Carlsson – producer, vocal producer, programmer, instrumentation
Mattias Bylund – strings
Rodney Jerkins – producer, instrumentation
Paul Dawson – producer, instrumentation
Matt Champlin – recorder
Kim Lumpkin – production coordinator
Rickard Goransson – producer, programmer, percussion
Jonas Thander – horns
Travis Sayles – producer, instrumentation
Harmony Samuels –  producer, instrumentation
Carmen Reece – vocal arranger
Jose Cardoza – engineer, recorder
Jo Blaq – vocal producer

Charts

Weekly charts

Year-end charts

Decade-end charts

Certifications and sales

Release history

See also 
 List of number-one albums of 2014 (Norway)
 List of number-one albums of 2014 (Australia)
 List of number-one albums of 2014 (Canada)
 List of number-one albums of 2014 (U.S.)

References 

2014 albums
Albums produced by Benny Blanco
Albums produced by Harmony Samuels
Albums produced by Ilya Salmanzadeh
Albums produced by Johan Carlsson
Albums produced by Key Wane
Albums produced by Max Martin
Albums produced by Oak Felder
Albums produced by Rodney Jerkins
Albums produced by Ryan Tedder
Albums produced by Shellback (record producer)
Albums produced by Tommy Brown (record producer)
Ariana Grande albums
Republic Records albums